Gleichen can refer to:

Places
Gleichen Castles in Germany
Gleichen, Lower Saxony, a municipality in Lower Saxony, Germany
Gleichen, Alberta, a town in southeast Alberta, Canada
Gleichen (electoral district), a former provincial electoral district in southeast Alberta from 1905 to 1963.
Drei Gleichen, a municipality in the district of Gotha, Germany
Die Gleichen, a pair of hills in the district of Göttingen in South Lower Saxony in Germany

People
Lord Edward Gleichen (1863–1937), a British courtier and soldier
Lady Feodora Gleichen (1861–1922), a British sculptor
Lady Helena Gleichen (1873–1947), a British painter
Wilhelm Friedrich von Gleichen (1717–1783), a German biologist
Ludwig von Gleichen-Rußwurm (1836–1901), a German impressionist painter